Boris Bjelkanović (born 27 September 1984 in Banja Luka) is a Croatian football player who most recently played for Malmö City .

References

HLSZ
lagstatistik.se

1984 births
Living people
Sportspeople from Banja Luka
Croats of Bosnia and Herzegovina
Association football central defenders
Croatian footballers
NK Krk players
NK Kamen Ingrad players
APEP FC players
Atromitos Yeroskipou players
NK Celje players
NK Pomorac 1921 players
Budapest Honvéd FC players
Budapest Honvéd FC II players
Putnok VSE footballers
KS Lushnja players
FC Rosengård 1917 players
BW 90 IF players
KSF Prespa Birlik players
Croatian Football League players
Cypriot First Division players
Slovenian PrvaLiga players
Nemzeti Bajnokság I players
Nemzeti Bajnokság II players
Kategoria Superiore players
First Football League (Croatia) players
Division 2 (Swedish football) players
Division 3 (Swedish football) players
Croatian expatriate footballers
Expatriate footballers in Slovenia
Croatian expatriate sportspeople in Slovenia
Expatriate footballers in Cyprus
Croatian expatriate sportspeople in Cyprus
Expatriate footballers in Hungary
Croatian expatriate sportspeople in Hungary
Expatriate footballers in Sweden
Croatian expatriate sportspeople in Sweden